The Coming is the debut studio album by American rapper Busta Rhymes. It was released on March 26, 1996, by Elektra Records. The album contains contributions by Def Squad members Redman, Keith Murray, and Jamal, Q-Tip, Zhané, Leaders of the New School and several Flipmode Squad members. Production was handled by DJ Scratch, Easy Mo Bee and the Ummah, among others. It serves as Rhymes's first solo album after the break up of Leaders of the New School two years prior, and Rhymes's first full-length project after numerous guest appearances on other songs with artists such as A Tribe Called Quest, the Notorious B.I.G., Heavy D and the Boyz and Mary J. Blige.

The album reached number six on the Billboard 200 chart in 1996 and received a Platinum certification from RIAA after selling 1,000,000 copies in the United States by February 1999. The lead single, "Woo-Hah!! Got You All in Check" reached number eight on the Billboard Hot 100 chart in 1996, and earned Rhymes his first nomination for Best Rap Solo Performance at the 39th Grammy Awards. Rhymes was the first artist on Elektra that received a Platinum certification.

In commemoration of its 25th anniversary, a super deluxe edition of The Coming featuring remixes, instrumentals and acapellas was released to all streaming platforms on April 16, 2021, by Rhino.

Background
The Coming serves as Rhymes's first solo album after the break up of his former group Leaders of the New School three years prior and Rhymes's first full-length project after numerous guest appearances on other songs with artists such as A Tribe Called Quest, Craig Mack, the Notorious B.I.G., Heavy D and the Boyz and Mary J. Blige. Rhymes had problems with recording a full album on his own and called up collaborator and mentor Q-Tip asking for help. After seven months of frustration, he eventually came up with what would develop into being the skit after "It's a Party".

Concept and title
Describing the concept of the album's title, Busta Rhymes said, "The Coming, I just felt, was such a general yet specific statement that the level of meaning is so powerful... The coming of what? When is it coming? How is it coming? Where is it coming from? Why is it coming?

Cover art
The cover art of The Coming was shot by Dean Karr. It displays a framed image of Rhymes with his mouth stretched wide, screaming. His locks are fanned out wildly behind his head with a white dove perched above him. The cover art is blurred and foggy.

Singles
"Woo-Hah!! Got You All in Check" was released as the first official single from The Coming on January 7, 1996. In the United States, the song was released on February 27, 1996, and included a notable remix version featuring Ol' Dirty Bastard. Flipmode Squad-member and Rhymes' cousin Rampage contributes additional vocals to the standard version and is credited as an official guest artist on some releases of the song. The song reached the top ten in the charts of the United Kingdom, United States and New Zealand, as well as charted in Sweden, the Netherlands, Scotland, Germany and Australia.

"It's a Party" featuring American R&B duo Zhané was released as the second official single from the album on June 25, 1996.

"Do My Thing" was released as the third and last official single from the album in 1997, outside of the United States. The song was previously issued as a promotional single.

Promotional singles
"Everything Remains Raw" was released as the first promotional single from The Coming on February 27, 1996, as the B-side to the album's lead single "Woo-Hah!! Got You All in Check.

"Do My Thing" and "Abandon Ship" featuring Rampage the Last Boy Scout were released together as the second and third promotional singles from the album in 1996. "Do My Thing" would be later released as an official single from the album.

"Ill Vibe" featuring American rapper Q-Tip was released as the fourth and last promotional single from the album on June 25, 1996, as the B-side to the album's second single "It's a Party" featuring Zhané.

Critical reception

Daryl McIntosh of Albumism wrote that "the heart and soul of the album is found on songs where Busta doesn't have to stand out amongst a large group [...] like "Everything Remains Raw", […] and "Do My Thing". [They] provide no distractions and illuminate how Busta's humor and knowledge can seep through a track while simultaneously highlighting his great rhyming ability.” He added that "The Coming did everything you could ask for from a debut album. It lived up to, if not exceeded, the expectations of a young artist who had captured the world's attention as a standout group member and coveted collaborator. It spawned radio hits, club bangers, and underground gems for hardcore listeners. It was boastful, colorful, and had a celebratory feel, all of which helped make hip-hop appear fun again […]. Even a casual observer […] had to take notice of the guy whose voice was deeper and louder than everyone else, an emcee who wasn't afraid to put on a big hat or bright colors to accentuate his colorful personality." He went on that "The Coming was one of the best solo rap performances of 1996 and it stands as one of the all-time great debut LPs in hip-hop. Busta's first verse, first single, and first album all stand as testaments to the fact that he is one of hip-hop's elite artists and the perennial main event.

Track listing

Notes
 "The Coming (Intro)" contains additional vocals by Lord Have Mercy and Rampage the Last Boy Scout.
 "Woo-Hah!! Got You All in Check" contains additional vocals by Rampage the Last Boy Scout. On some versions of the song he is credited as an official featured artist
 "Keep It Movin'" contains skit vocals by Rampage the Last Boy Scout.
 "The End of the World (Outro)" contains skit vocals by Spliff Star and Wade Thoren.

Samples used
 "The Coming (Intro)" contains a sample of "Goin' Down" by Ol' Dirty Bastard.
 "Abandon Ship" contains samples of "(Don't Want No) Woman" by Lee Michaels and "Space" by Galt MacDermot.
 "Woo-Hah!! Got You All in Check" contains a sample of "Space" by Galt MacDermot and an interpolation of "8th Wonder" by the Sugarhill Gang.
 "It's a Party" contains samples of "Fun" by Brick and "Hydra" by Grover Washington Jr..
 "Ill Vibe" contains a sample of "Dizzy" by Hugo Montenegro.
 "Flipmode Squad Meets Def Squad" contains interpolations of "Rated 'R'" by Redman and "Lick the Balls" by Slick Rick
 "Still Shining" contains a sample of "Where Is Love" by Cal Tjader and an interpolation of "Scenario (Remix)" by A Tribe Called Quest featuring Kid Hood and Leaders of the New School.
 "Keep It Movin'" contains samples of "Recess" by Eddie Harris and "Ecstasy" by Ohio Players.
 "The Finish Line'" contains a sample of "Dark Alleys" by Arif Mardin.
 "The End of the World (Outro)" contains samples of "Fanfare for the Common Man" by Aaron Copland and "O Fortuna" by Carl Orff.

Personnel

Performance

Busta Rhymes – lead vocals
Rampage the Last Boy Scout – guest vocals , additional vocals , skit vocals 
Zhané – guest vocals 
Q-Tip – guest vocals 
Jamal – guest vocals 
Redman – guest vocals 
Keith Murray – guest vocals 
Lord Have Mercy – guest vocals , additional vocals 
Dinco D – guest vocals 
Milo – guest vocals 
Charlie Brown – guest vocals 
Spliff Star – skit vocals 
Wade Thoren – skit vocals

Production

Busta Rhymes – executive production, production 
Rick Posada – executive producuction
Rick St. Hilaire – production 
DJ Scratch – production 
Easy Mo Bee – production 
Rashad "Ringo" Smith – production 
The Vibe Chemist Backspin – production 
Q-Tip – production as part of the Ummah 
Jay Dee – production as part of the Ummah

Technical

Tom Coyne – mastering
Rick St. Hilaire – mixing , recording 
Busta Rhymes – mixing , arrangement 
DJ Scratch – mixing , arrangement 
Easy Mo Bee – mixing , arrangement 
Andy Blakelock – mixing , recording 
The Vibe Chemist Backspin – mixing , recording , arrangement 
Q-Tip – mixing , arrangement 
Jay Dee – mixing , arrangement 
Peter Darmi – mixing , recording 
Mike Scielzi – assistant recording 
Vinnie Nicoletti – assistant recording

Charts

Weekly charts

Year-end charts

Certifications

See also 
 List of Billboard number-one R&B albums of 1996

References 

Busta Rhymes albums
1996 debut albums
Albums produced by J Dilla
Albums produced by Easy Mo Bee
Albums produced by DJ Scratch
Albums produced by Rashad Smith
Albums produced by Q-Tip (musician)
Conglomerate (record label) albums
Elektra Records albums